The Indian Sale of Goods Act, 1930 is a mercantile law which came into existence on 1 July 1930, during the British Raj, borrowing heavily from the United Kingdom's Sale of Goods Act 1893. It provides for the setting up of contracts where the seller transfers or agrees to transfer the title (ownership) in the goods to the buyer for consideration. It is applicable all over India. Under the act, goods sold from owner to buyer must be sold for a certain price and at a given period of time. The act was amended on 23 September 1963, and was renamed to the Sale of Goods Act, 1930. It is still in force in India, after being amended in 1963, and in Bangladesh, as the Sale of Goods Act, 1930 (Bangladesh).

Definition
The definitions as per Section II (s.2 Of Sale of Goods Act 1930) of the Act are as follows:

Contract
A Contract of Sale is:
an offer to buy for a price, or 
An offer to sell good for a price, and 
the acceptance of such offer.

A Contract may provide for:
the immediate delivery of the goods, or 
immediate payment of the price, or 
the immediate delivery of the goods and payment both, or 
for the delivery or payment by installments, or 
that the delivery or payment or both shall be postponed.
per the Section 5 sub-clause (2) - Subject to the provisions of any law for the time being in force, a contract of sale may be made- 
in writing or 
by word of mouth, or 
partly in writing and partly by word of mouth or
may be implied from the conduct of the parties.

   Goods
Goods are every kind of moveable property other than actionable claims and money, and include:
 Stock and shares,
 Growing crops, 
 Grass, and 
 Things attached to or forming part of land which is agreed to be severed before sale or under the contract of sale.

Future goods are goods that are to be:
 manufactured, or 
 produced, or 
 acquired, by the seller after making of the contract of sale

According to the act, the goods which form the subject of a contract of sale may be either existing goods, owned or possessed by the seller, or future goods and there may be a contract for the sale of goods the acquisition of which by the seller depends upon a contingency which may or may not happen. Where by a contract of sale the seller purports to effect a present sale of future goods, the contract operates as an agreement to sell the goods.

Events and Participants

Sale of Goods
A contract of sale of goods is a contract whereby the seller transfers or agrees to transfer the property in goods to the buyer for a price. There may be a contract of sale between one part-owner and another.

Mercantile Agent
A Mercantile Agent has the customary course of business as agent authority: 
 either to sell goods, or 
 to consign goods for the purposes of sale, or 
 to buy goods, or 
 to raise money on the security of goods. section-9(2)

Buyer
A person who buys or agrees to buy goods.
Pricerefers to money considered for sale of goods. The price in a contract of sale may be fixed by the contract, or may be left to be fixed in manner thereby agreed, or may be determined by the course of dealing between the parties. Where the price is not determined in accordance with the foregoing provisions, the buyer shall pay the seller a reasonable price. Where there is an agreement to sell goods on the terms that- the price is to be fixed by the valuation of a third party, and such third party cannot or does not make such valuation, the agreement is thereby avoided, provided the goods or any part thereof have been delivered to the buyer, and appropriated by the buyer, the buyer shall pay a reasonable price.

In the event of a dispute, the party not in fault may maintain a suit for damages against the party in fault.

Delivery
means voluntary transfer of possession from one person to another.

State of Delivery
Goods are said to be in a "delivered state" when they are in such state that the buyer would under the contract be bound to take delivery of them.

Documentation of goods
 Bill of lading dock-warrant,
 Warehouse keeper's certificate,
 Wharfingers' certificate, 
 Railway receipt, 
 RC book of car, 
 Multimodal transport document,
 Warrant or order for the delivery of goods, and 
 Any other document used in the ordinary course of business as proof of the possession or control of goods or authorizing or purporting to authorize, either by endorsement or by delivery, the possessor of the document to transfer or receive goods thereby represented.

Damage
Goods are said to be damaged/perished if:
The goods, at the time when the contract was made, have perished or become so damaged as no longer to answer to their description in the contract, and
Neither seller nor buyer have the knowledge about such destroyed/damaged.

As per Section 8 of Sale of Goods Act, where there is an agreement to sell specific goods, and subsequently the goods without any fault on the part of the seller or buyer perish or become so damaged as no longer to answer to their description in the agreement before the risk passes to the buyer, the agreement is thereby avoided.

Violation
A "Fault" is defined as a wrongful act by default.

A person is said to be "insolvent" when:
 who has ceased to pay his debts in the ordinary course of business, or 
 cannot pay his debts as they become due, whether he has committed an act of insolvency or not.

Other Definitions
 "price" means the money consideration for a sale of goods.
 "property" means the general property in goods, and not merely a special property.
 "quality of goods" includes their state or condition.
 "seller" means a person who sells or agrees to sell goods. 
 "specific goods" means goods identified and agreed upon at the time a contract of sale is made.
 expressions used but not defined in this Act and defined in the Indian Contract Act, 1872, have the meaning assigned to them in that act.

Requirements and Agreements

Section 4 of Sale of Goods Act define the term "Sale" and "agreement to sell" as follows:
 A contract of sale of goods is a contract whereby the seller transfers or agrees to transfer the property in goods to the buyer for a price. There may be a contract of sale between one part-owner and another.
 A contract of sale may be absolute or conditional.
 Where under a contract of sale the property in the goods is transferred from the seller to the buyer, the contract is called a sale, but where the transfer of the property in the goods is to take place at a future time or subject to some condition thereafter to be fulfilled, the contract is called an agreement to sell.
 An agreement to sell becomes a sale when the time elapses or the conditions are fulfilled subject to which the property in the goods is to be transferred.

The following must be fulfilled:
There must be a contract,
In Such contract the seller transfers or agrees to transfer the property in goods to the buyer,
Such transfer is made for price,
Sale may be made between one part-owner and another,
A contract of sale may be absolute or conditional.
At the time of agreement if the goods is in existence, it is contract of sale otherwise in respect to future goods, it is agreement to sale.

References

Bare Act of Sale of Goods Act
Mercantile Law by Areeb Shamsi.
Indian Taxation and Corporate Law

Contract law
Indian business law
Acts of the Imperial Legislative Council
1930 in British law
1930 in law
1930 in India